The 2008 Blaupunkt SEAT Cupra Championship season was the sixth and final season of the SEAT Cupra Championship. It began on 30 March at Brands Hatch, and ended on 21 September at the same circuit, supporting rounds of the British Touring Car Championship.

Teams and drivers
All drivers drove Mk2 SEAT Leóns.

Race calendar and results

Championship standings
 Drivers' top 18 results count towards the championship.

References

External links
 tsl-timing

SEAT Cupra
SEAT Cupra Championship seasons